The International Olympic Committee (IOC) uses three-letter abbreviation country codes to refer to each group of athletes that participate in the Olympic Games.  Each geocode usually identifies a National Olympic Committee (NOC), but there are several codes that have been used for other instances in past Games, such as teams composed of athletes from multiple nations, or groups of athletes not formally representing any nation.

Several of the IOC codes are different from the standard ISO 3166-1 alpha-3 codes. Other sporting organisations like FIFA use similar country codes to refer to their respective teams, but with some differences. Still others, such as the Commonwealth Games Federation or Association of Tennis Professionals, use the IOC list verbatim.

Because French is the first reference language of the IOC, followed by English, followed by the host country's language when necessary, most IOC codes have their origins from French or English.

History
The 1956 Winter Olympics and 1960 Summer Olympics were the first Games to feature Initials of Nations to refer to each NOC in the published official reports. However, the codes used at the next few Games were often based on the host nation's language (e.g., GIA for Japan at the 1956 Winter Olympics and 1960 Summer Olympics, both held in Italy, from Italian Giappone) or based on the French name for the nation (e.g., AUT for Austria, from Autriche).  By the 1972 Winter Olympics, most codes were standardized on the current usage, but several have changed in recent years.  Additionally, the dissolution of the Soviet Union, division and unification of Germany, breakup of Yugoslavia, dissolution of Czechoslovakia, and several other instances of geographical renaming have all resulted in code changes.

In addition to this list of over 200 NOCs, the participation of National Paralympic Committees (NPCs) at the Paralympic Games requires standardised IOC codes, such as Macau (or as "Macau, China" since 1999) and the Faroe Islands, coded MAC and FRO respectively.

Current NOCs
There are 206 current NOCs (National Olympic Committees) within the Olympic Movement.  The following tables show the currently used code for each NOC and any different codes used in past Games, per the official reports from those Games.  Some of the past code usage is further explained in the following sections.  Codes used specifically for a Summer Games only or a Winter Games only, within the same year, are indicated by "S" and "W" respectively.

Current NPCs 
Most National Paralympic Committees (NPC) cover a territory with an active NOC. In these cases the NPC codes matches the IOC codes shown above. The two current NPCs without a corresponding NOC use the following NPC codes.

Historic NOCs and teams

Codes still in use
Fourteen historical NOCs or teams have codes that are still used in the IOC results database to refer to past medal winners from these teams.

Obsolete codes
Unlike the previous list, these codes no longer appear in the IOC results database. When a past athlete from one of these teams has won a medal, the new code is shown next to them instead.

Two other significant code changes have occurred, both because of a change in the nation's designation as used by the IOC:
 HOL was changed to NED for the Netherlands for the 1992 Games, reflecting the change in designation from Holland.
 IRN was changed to IRI for Iran for the 1992 Games, reflecting the change in designation to Islamic Republic of Iran.

Special codes for Olympics

Special codes for Paralympics

Special codes for World Games
The World Games are a multi-sport event comprising sports and sporting disciplines that are not contested in the Olympic Games. The World Games are governed by the International World Games Association, under the patronage of the International Olympic Committee.

See also

 Comparison of IOC, FIFA, and ISO 3166 country codes
 List of FIFA country codes
 Lists of National Olympic Committees by continental association:
 Association of National Olympic Committees of Africa
 European Olympic Committees
 Oceania National Olympic Committees
 Olympic Council of Asia
 Pan American Sports Organization
 List of participating nations at the Summer Olympic Games
 List of participating nations at the Winter Olympic Games
 List of CGF country codes
 ISO 3166-1

References

Sources

IOC list
IOC Country Codes
International Olympic Committee